Alaska Power and Telephone Company is a communications and utilities firm operating in Alaska. It currently provides service above the Arctic Circle, in the Wrangell Mountains, and throughout southeast Alaska. Its business units are named Power, Telephone, Hydro-Power, Wireless, and Internet.

See also
List of United States telephone companies

External links
 Alaska Power and Telephone Company

Companies based in Port Townsend, Washington
Telecommunications companies of the United States